"How Deep Is Your Love" is a song by Scottish DJ and record producer Calvin Harris and English production trio Disciples. It was released on 17 July 2015. It features uncredited vocals by Norwegian singer and songwriter Ina Wroldsen. 

The single received generally positive reviews, and was commercially successful, reaching the top-ten in 22 countries, including number two on the UK Singles Chart and number one in Australia, Belgium, Greece, the Netherlands and Russia.

Background and composition
On 3 June 2015, Harris announced an upcoming collaboration with London-based production trio Disciples. The song leaked on 15 July 2015, two days prior to its official release.

The song first materialised when London-based band Disciples and Norwegian singer-songwriter Ina Wroldsen co-wrote it in early 2014. They recorded the vocals of Wroldsen in one take for the demo. Two of the artists from Disciples who are published by Fly-Eye (Harris's publishing company) decided to send him the rough demonstration for feedback and pointers. Harris loved the track and eventually proposed collaborating on it together.

Harris told KISS-FM that following the release of Motion, he wanted to do something else, something a bit different. He wanted a single out for the summer because it had been so long since it had happened. "I missed the feeling of having a new song out in the summer."

"How Deep Is Your Love" is a deep house song. Your EDM described it as an "upbeat tune", containing "bass-y plucks and piano chords". For Hayden Manders of Nylon, the track is influenced by 90s Euro house and compared it to Disclosure's music.

Critical reception
Billboard called the song "another dance club anthem from the reliable hitmaker." Hayden Manders of Nylon felt Harris returned to form thanks to "How Deep Is Your Love". Writing for Jezebel Jia Tolentino described it as "a straightforward, minimalist full-on heater with a contagious playfulness in its three main hooks" and credited Disciples for "the subtlety in this track". Daniel Cha from Your EDM opined that the song is "an ideal soundtrack to an oceanside drive".

Lewis Corner of Digital Spy wrote "Calvin Harris is ready to soundtrack the rest of your summer with his new deep house banger." Time Nolan Feeney wrote: "'How Deep Is Your Love' doesn’t evoke the pummeling build-ups and synthesizer onslaughts of Rihanna's 'We Found Love' or Cheryl Cole's 'Call My Name'. Instead, [Harris] opts for some slow-burning house. If his next album sounds this fresh, the love will go pretty deep, actually."

Commercial performance
"How Deep Is Your Love" entered at number seven on the UK Singles Chart, giving Harris his 19th top ten hit on the chart. The song eventually peaked at number two. The song debuted at number five on the US Hot Dance/Electronic Songs. It sold 41,000 downloads and captured two million U.S. streams (the bulk of which, 74 percent, came from Spotify) in its first week. It marked Harris' eighth top ten since the chart's launch, making it the most of any act (previously, he was tied with Zedd at seven each).

Additionally, the song debuted at number four on Dance/Electronic Digital Songs and at number six on the Dance/Electronic Streaming Songs. On its tenth week, it has hit number three on both the Hot Dance/Electronic Songs and the Dance/Electronic Streaming Songs and reahced number two on the Dance/Electronic Digital Songs and the Dance Club Songs. The song also debuted on Dance/Mix Show Airplay at number 24. It eventually reached number one on the chart after 10 weeks, giving Harris his ninth number one on this chart. Since the chart began in 2003, only Rihanna has racked up more number ones (11 hits). The single also debuted on the Billboard Hot 100 at number 60. and has since peaked at number 27.

In the Australian ARIA Singles Chart, the song debuted at number eight and in its sixth week on the chart, reached number one. It is Harris' first number-one single there.

Music video
The accompanying music video for "How Deep Is Your Love", directed by Emil Nava, premiered on Tidal on 4 August 2015 and was released elsewhere on 6 August 2015. It features American model Gigi Hadid. Filming took place in Malibu, California in late June 2015.
The video begins with Gigi laying on a table which she gets up on and walks down a hall into a party with bikinied women. Other scenes include Gigi flashing in different colors in a black background. Gigi then finds herself on a sea boat with water bikers. She then is transported to a pool where she dives into and walks out and takes off her clothes and hops in a shower and moves into another party room. Next, she is shown with motorcycles swarming around her. The video ends with Gigi walking out of the party room. It won Best Electronic Video at the 2016 MTV Video Music Awards.

Covers
In September 2015, American singer Charlie Puth covered the song on BBC Radio 1 and the version was included in the compilation BBC Radio 1's Live Lounge. Slovenian duo Maraaya also covered the song, their cover can be found on their YouTube channel. Rihanna samples the song on her Anti World Tour while performing "We Found Love".

Track listing

Charts

Weekly charts

Year-end charts

Decade-end charts

Certifications

Release history

See also
List of Airplay 100 number ones of the 2010s

References

2015 singles
2015 songs
Calvin Harris songs
Columbia Records singles
Songs written by Calvin Harris
Songs written by Ina Wroldsen
Dutch Top 40 number-one singles
Number-one singles in Greece
Number-one singles in Israel
Number-one singles in Romania
Number-one singles in Russia
Number-one singles in Australia